Koevtsi may refer to the following places in Bulgaria:

Koevtsi, Gabrovo Province
Koevtsi, Veliko Tarnovo Province